Gemma Christina Arterton (born 2 February 1986) is an English actress and producer. After her stage debut in Shakespeare's Love's Labour's Lost at the Globe Theatre (2007), Arterton made her feature film debut in the comedy St Trinian's (2007). She portrayed Bond Girl Strawberry Fields in the James Bond film Quantum of Solace (2008), a performance which won her an Empire Award for Best Newcomer.

Arterton has since appeared in a number of films, including The Disappearance of Alice Creed (2009), Tamara Drewe (2010), Clash of the Titans (2010), Prince of Persia: The Sands of Time (2010), Hansel & Gretel: Witch Hunters (2013), Their Finest (2016), The Escape (2017), and Vita and Virginia (2018). She received the Harper's Bazaar Woman of the Year Award for acting in and producing The Escape. Her theatrical highlights have included starring in The Duchess of Malfi (2014), Made in Dagenham (2014), Nell Gwynn (2016) and Saint Joan (2017). Arterton was nominated for Olivier Awards for her work on both Nell Gwynn and Made in Dagenham, and she won the Evening Standard Theatre Award for the latter.

Since 2016, Arterton has run her own production company, Rebel Park Productions, which focuses on creating female-led content in front of and behind the camera. She has executive-produced four feature films and two short films. She is also on record as being a supporter of the Time's Up, ERA 50:50 and MeToo movements. Arterton played an integral role in persuading actresses to wear black at the 2018 BAFTAs in support of Time'sUp, and has been involved with ERA 50:50, an equal pay campaign in the UK, since its inception.

Early life and education
Arterton was born at North Kent Hospital in Gravesend with polydactyly, a condition resulting in extra fingers which a doctor removed shortly after her birth. Her mother, Sally-Anne Heap, runs a cleaning business, and her father, Barry J. Arterton, is a welder. They divorced during Arterton's early childhood, and she grew up on a council estate with her mother and younger sister, Hannah Arterton, who is also an actress. Her matrilineal great-grandmother was a German-Jewish concert violinist.

Arterton attended Gravesend Grammar School for Girls, a state grammar school in Kent (now Mayfield Grammar School) and made her amateur stage debut in a production of Alan Ayckbourn's The Boy Who Fell into a Book. Her performance won her the best actress prize in a competition at a local festival.

At age 16, Arterton left Gravesend Grammar School to attend acting college at the Miskin Theatre at North Kent College in Dartford. She later studied at the Royal Academy of Dramatic Art (RADA), graduating in 2008.

Career
 
Arterton had her first professional role in Stephen Poliakoff's Capturing Mary while she was still at drama school. She made her stage debut as Rosaline in Shakespeare's Love's Labour's Lost at the Globe Theatre in London in July 2007 before graduating later that year. She made her film debut in St Trinian's (2007) as Head Girl Kelly.

In 2008, she appeared in the James Bond film Quantum of Solace. Chosen from around fifteen hundred candidates, Arterton plays Bond Girl Strawberry Fields, in what is described as a "nice-sized role". Arterton describes her character as "the thinking man's crumpet". In the same year, she played the eponymous protagonist in the BBC adaptation of Thomas Hardy's Tess of the d'Urbervilles. Also in 2008, she played Elizabeth Bennet in the ITV serial, Lost in Austen. Her most controversial role to date was in the 2009 film The Disappearance of Alice Creed, in which her character is kidnapped and abused in several graphic nude scenes. The role required her to be handcuffed to a bed and wear a ball gag in her mouth throughout. She requested that she be left tied to the bed even when the camera was not on her to help her performance. She joked that the crew would put the ball gag back in if she was chatting too much. The film was well received, with Frank Scheck for The Hollywood Reporter noting, "Arterton… handles the rigorous physical and emotional demands of her role with great skill".

Arterton was the face of Avon's Bond Girl 007 fragrance, when it was launched in October 2008. In 2010, Arterton made her West End debut in the UK premiere of The Little Dog Laughed. She was originally attached to star in a new adaptation of Wuthering Heights as Catherine Earnshaw; however, she later left the project.

Arterton appeared in pivotal roles in the 2010 films Clash of the Titans and Prince of Persia: The Sands of Time, and played the lead in Tamara Drewe. In 2010 Arterton also starred in the Almeida Theatre's production of The Master Builder directed by Travis Preston, where she was widely praised for her performance as Hilde Wangel. In 2011, Arterton was nominated for the British Academy of Film and Television Arts Rising Star Award and was under consideration for Leading Actress for her performances in Tamara Drewe and The Disappearance of Alice Creed. In November 2012, she was selected as a member of the main competition jury at the 2012 International Film Festival of Marrakech.

Arterton starred in the action horror film Hansel and Gretel: Witch Hunters as Gretel, opposite Jeremy Renner who played Hansel. The 3-D film was set 15 years after Hansel and Gretel killed the witch who kidnapped them. It was released on 25 January 2013. In January 2014, she took the title role in John Webster's The Duchess of Malfi, the inaugural production at the Sam Wanamaker Playhouse, the new indoor theatre at Shakespeare's Globe. Both the play and Arterton herself received positive reviews, with Paul Taylor for The Independent reporting. "The luminous Gemma Arterton beautifully captures the multi-faceted quality of the Duchess". In the same year, she starred with Ryan Reynolds, Anna Kendrick and Jacki Weaver in the psychological thriller film, The Voices.

In 2015, Arterton starred as the titular lead in Gemma Bovery. The film is a re-imagining of Gustave Flaubert's 19th century classic Madame Bovary directed by Anne Fontaine. Arterton learnt to speak French for the role, never having spoken the language previously.
 
In 2014–2015, Arterton starred in Made in Dagenham, a stage musical about the Ford sewing machinists strike of 1968 concerning equal pay for women. Since its premiere on 5 November 2014 at the Adelphi Theatre in London, she has publicly expressed her support for their cause. She played a fictional character named Rita O'Grady and her performance received mixed reviews from critics. Simon Edge, for the Daily Express, complained of an "underpowered central performance from Gemma Arterton as Rita". However, Matt Trueman for Variety praised Arterton for her "all-out star turn" and Paul Taylor, for The Independent, praised how "Arterton holds the show together beautifully". Despite the show closing after only five months, Arterton was nevertheless nominated for an Olivier Award for best actress in a musical, and went on to win the Evening Standard award for Newcomer in a Musical.

In a 2015 interview with the Independent newspaper, Arterton stated that she was the director Jonathan Glazer's choice for the lead role in his movie Under the Skin. Glazer, however, was forced to recast because Arterton was not famous enough for the film to secure financing.

In February 2016, Arterton started a run playing the title role in the Shakespeare's Globe transfer of Nell Gwynn, at the West End's Apollo Theatre. Arterton was praised by critics, with Michael Billington for The Guardian citing her "natural sparkle". For her performance she was nominated for an Olivier Award for Best Actress in a Play. In July 2016, she was named as a member of the main competition jury for the 73rd Venice International Film Festival. Also in this year, Arterton was nominated for a BIFA Award for Best Supporting Actress for her role as the teacher Helen Justineau in The Girl with All the Gifts. Her performance, a story set in a dystopian future world ravaged by a zombie pathogen, was generally well reviewed.

In 2016, Arterton set up Rebel Park Productions to create female-lead and female-centric film and TV projects. She produced the well-received short film Leading Lady Parts in support of Time's Up. The film starred Emilia Clarke, Tom Hiddleston and Gemma Chan and helped to raise awareness for the UK Justice and Equality Fund. In the same year, she played one of four lead roles in Arnaud des Pallières' French language film Orpheline (Orphan), a role in which she exercised the French language skills she had acquired for her role in Gemma Bovery.

In 2017, Arterton took on the role of Joan in Josie Rourke's interpretation of George Bernard Shaw's classic story Saint Joan. While the play itself received mixed reviews, Arterton's performance was widely praised as the highlight of the show. In the same year, she appeared as the fictional young screenwriter Catrin Cole in Their Finest, a wartime romcom about a propaganda film crew working during the Second World War. Arterton's performance amongst the impressive ensemble of supporting actors (Bill Nighy, Sam Claflin and Eddie Marsan) was generally well received.

In 2018, Arterton produced and co-created The Escape, a largely improvised film about a mother struggling with the breakdown of her marriage. The film received excellent reviews and Arterton was nominated for a BIFA award for Best Actress in a British Independent Film. She was awarded Woman of the Year by Harper's Bazaar magazine for her work on the film. Also in 2018, Arterton was one of 928 new members invited to join the Academy of Motion Picture Arts and Sciences, 49% of whom were female as part of the Academy's ongoing attempt to increase representation.

In 2018, it was announced that Arterton would play late singer Dusty Springfield in a film about her life. However, no further news about the project has been released since. 

In 2019, Arterton appeared in the Netflix comedy Murder Mystery (which stars Adam Sandler, Jennifer Aniston and Luke Evans). Despite the film's largely negative reviews, it was watched by 30.9 million Netflix account-holders in its first three days of release, then a record for the streaming service. In the same year, Arterton played the socialite and author Vita Sackville-West in Vita and Virginia, a film about the romantic relationship between Arterton's character and Virginia Woolf which was the inspiration for Woolf's novel Orlando: A Biography. Arterton is credited as executive producer of the film. She also produced and starred in the short film Hayley Alien, which was written and directed by her sister and co-star, Hannah Arterton.

Arterton was an executive producer and starred in the Second World War film, Summerland, directed by Jessica Swale. Arterton had previously worked with Swale on the stage show Nell Gwynn.

Personal life
Arterton met production assistant John Nolan on the set of Quantum of Solace and they lived together in London. In 2008, she had a relationship with the Spanish stuntman Eduardo Muñoz, whom she met on the set of Prince of Persia: The Sands of Time. They lived together in a London flat, but they split up after six months.

Arterton married Stefano Catelli in 2010; however, they separated in 2013, and, in August 2015, their divorce was finalised "by consent" at the Central Family Court in High Holborn. Arterton said she "never really believed in exchanging vows" and that she was not sure she would "want to walk down the aisle again". In 2013, Arterton stated that she wanted to wait until she has accomplished something in the acting world before having children.

In 2019, she married actor Rory Keenan.

On 4 November 2022, she confirmed that she was expecting her first child with Keenan. Their son was born in December.

Filmography

Film

Television

Music videos
 "Kerala" (2016) by Bonobo
 "Remember Where You Are" (2021) by Jessie Ware

Theatre credits

Accolades

References

External links

 

1986 births
21st-century English actresses
Living people
Actresses from Kent
Alumni of North West Kent College
Alumni of RADA
English film actresses
English people of Scottish descent
English people of German-Jewish descent
English stage actresses
English television actresses
People educated at Mayfield Grammar School
People from Gravesend, Kent
English Shakespearean actresses
People with polydactyly
English voice actresses